is a 1996 Japanese V-Cinema erotic thriller film starring Kumiko Takeda. It is the third installment in the Zero Woman series.

Plot synopsis
Our main character, Rei, is a woman without a past. She works for the Zero Department, an underground police force. She is assigned to kill a group of crime bosses. At the same time, she is haunted by visions of her deceased father and ends up seeking solace of a man,  who is later to be revealed to be the hitman hired by the group of crime bosses. Rei now faces a difficult choice.

Cast

Japanese cast
 Kumiko Takeda as Rei
 Keiji Matsuda as Katsumura
 Tokuma Nishimura as Takefuji
 Marie Jinno as Sayoko
 Charlie Yutani as Daidoji
 Mari Nishima as Tomomi

English voice cast
 Dorothy Melendrez as Rei
 Jackson Daniels as Katsumura
 Abe Lasser as Takefuji
 Melissa Williamson as Sayoko
 Anthony Mozdy as Daidoji
 Roberta Endo as Tomomi
 John Smallberries as Goda, Kuronuma
 David Umansky as Kitoh
 Bob Bobson as Delivery Guy
 David Lucas as Zero Boss, Rei's Dad
 Wendee Lee as Dominatrix
 Ian Hawk as Boy
 Kaeko Sakamoto as Hostess

Release
The film was released direct-to-video in Japan on VHS on March 5, 1996 and was later released on DVD on March 25, 2000. Central Park Media licensed the film under their Asia Pulp Cinema label. It was released on VHS subtitled on February 22, 2000 and dubbed VHS on April 15, 2001. CPM later released the film on DVD on July 9, 2002. The English dub was produced by Bang Zoom! Entertainment in Burbank, California.

Reception
TV Guide's Reed Lowie gave the film two stars. He said the film goes off through a slow start, and not enough action to satisfy the viewer, although Lowie also complimented on how the cinematography was well-done (aside from a few scenes that were shot in the dark. Jim Mclennan of GirlswithGuns.org described the film as "grimly fiendish, yet effective killer's romance".

See also
 Girls with guns
 Zero Woman, for a list of movies in the series.

References

External links
 

1996 crime thriller films
1990s erotic thriller films
1996 direct-to-video films
1996 films
Central Park Media
Direct-to-video erotic thriller films
Japanese direct-to-video films
Japanese erotic thriller films
1990s Japanese films
1990s Japanese-language films